Provocateur is a 2017 Hong Kong television drama produced by Wong Wai-sing and TVB. It premiered on TVB Jade in Hong Kong, Hub Drama First in Singapore and Astro On Demand in Malaysia on 6 March 2017. It stars Gallen Lo in his first TVB drama since 2009's Born Rich.

Synopsis
After the deaths of his first and second wife, cosmetic mogul Cheuk Kwan-lam, known as "King", tries to turn over a new leaf. As fate would have it, he encounters a resourceful young man known as Ringo Poon, through whom he sees a younger version of himself. King develops a familial attachment towards Ringo. The young man also wins the favor of King's secretary Rachel Chan, who believes that Ringo would lead the company, Endless Beauty, to success.

Rachel, still mourning over the disappearance of her husband Vincent many years ago, drowns herself with work. Endless Beauty, as well as King himself, becomes her sole purpose in life. Ringo exploits the trust Rachel has in him, also winning King's approval. Little do they know that Ringo is actually secretly conspiring with a team of talented people on the sly to steal trade secrets from large corporations for money. Ringo has been planning this for years, seeking the best opportunity to take destructive revenge on Endless Beauty.

Cast and characters
Gallen Lo as Cheuk Kwan-lam – known as King, the chairman of Endless Beauty, a successful Hong Kong cosmetics corporation. King is a cunning businessman who uses underhanded methods to take down his competitors. He's been through two marriages, both ending with his wives' passing. King has a close relationship with his personal assistant, Rachel, and his stepdaughter, Mani, who he has been cultivating to succeed his business.
Fred Cheng as Ringo Poon Siu-kit – King's son who has been separated from King for a long time with his mother. He's a talented young man who is recruited into Endless Beauty as one of the company's two marketing managers. Ringo actually belongs to a team of young conspirators who steal trade secrets from large corporations for money. Sharing a mysterious past with King, Ringo has been eyeing Endless Beauty for quite some time, waiting for the right time to seek revenge.
Ali Lee as Rachel Chan Hei-man – King's personal assistant. She is a single mother, whose husband has been missing for many years.
Jacqueline Wong as Mani Cheuk Man-lei – known as Sal Jeh, King's stepdaughter, to whom he is very close with. Mani is one of the two marketing managers at Endless Beauty. Her driven and ambitious personality puts her at odds with Ringo.
Jack Wu as Lam Shun-fai – affectionately known as Turtle, a corporate spy and a member of Ringo's team. Turtle is an expert in disguise, and often acts as the inside man in a heist.
Jonathan Cheung as Cyrus Ling Chun – a corporate spy and a member of Ringo's team. Cyrus is in charge of collecting intel for the team.
Roxanne Tong as Amber Chau Pui-yu – a corporate spy and a member of Ringo's team. Amber is the team's social networker. She is from a wealthy family but is the daughter of her father's mistress. Amber and her half-sister are both fashion designers since their father owns a fashion enterprise.
Winki Lai as To Chi-yan – known as Yan Yan, an IT genius and a member of Ringo's team, acting as the team's hacker.
Stephanie Che as Laura – Rachel's close friend. Laura owns a clothing business and babysits Rachel's son.
Jimmy Au as Tsang King-sang – King's right-hand man and chauffeur.
Lee Shing-cheong as Chin Wing-tong – King's opponent.
Raymond Cho as Vincent Hong Yat-fung – Rachel's husband, who has disappeared.
Yeung Chiu-hoi as Howard Luk Kai-ho – Mani's boyfriend.
Law Lok-lam as Luk Yat Fan- Howard's father.  Wanted his son to marry Mani to help the family business.  Later teams up with King's rival, Chin Wing-tong, and becomes a board member of Endless Beauty.  Wants to see King fail.
Aurora Li as Eva - Works at Endless Beauty, a member of Mani's marketing team (Team A).  Like her other Team A members, Eva constantly has to rush writing proposals and reports for her demanding career woman boss, Mani.  Eva along with her team members resent the constant workload given to them by Mani.  Spends time shopping online every time Mani is away from the office. 
Carat Cheung as Apple -  Works at Endless Beauty, a member of Ringo's marketing team (Team B).  Unlike Team A, members of Team B have a more relaxed work environment.
Dickson Lee as TC - Hired by King to be the CEO of Endless Beauty.
Joseph Yeung as Peter- King's private doctor.

Soundtrack
Track listing

Reception

Broadcast
The series premiere of Provocateur aired on 6 March 2017. It is also broadcast by Astro On Demand in Malaysia and StarHub's TVB First in Singapore, premiering it on the same time as Hong Kong.

In Hong Kong, the first episode received an average viewership rating of 25 points and peaked at 26 points, reaching 1.68 million viewers.

Critical reception
The debut week of Provocateur received mixed responses. On Douban, a Chinese media database, the drama received a rating of 5.8 out of 10 based on 500 votes. Most of the criticism was directed at female lead Ali Lee, who was criticised for her dull acting in the first two episodes. Gallen Lo's performance, however, received critical acclaim, with viewers citing Lo as their reason for tuning into the series.

Awards and nominations

References

External links
Provocateur Official TVB website 

TVB original programming
Hong Kong television series
Hong Kong action television series
2010s Hong Kong television series
2017 Hong Kong television series debuts
Television series set in the 2010s